Naumovski is a surname. Notable people with the surname include:

Kristijan Naumovski (born 1988), Macedonian footballer
Lou Naumovski (born 1957), Canadian businessman
Vasko Naumovski (born 1980), Macedonian diplomat and politician